Alan Williams (3 June 1938 – 18 May 2017) was an English footballer who made more than 550 appearances in the Football League playing as a centre half for Bristol City, Oldham Athletic, Watford, Newport County and Swansea Town. He also played non-league football for Cheltenham Town, Gloucester City and Keynsham Town.

His son Gary also played League football.

References

1938 births
2017 deaths
English footballers
Footballers from Bristol
Association football defenders
Bristol City F.C. players
Oldham Athletic A.F.C. players
Watford F.C. players
Newport County A.F.C. players
Swansea City A.F.C. players
Cheltenham Town F.C. players
Gloucester City A.F.C. players
Keynsham Town F.C. players
English Football League players